South Park Avenue is a street connecting Buffalo to Hamburg in New York, United States.  South Park Avenue is the most important street in South Buffalo and is the primary alternative to the Buffalo Skyway (New York State Route 5) when traveling between the city and the southern suburbs.

South Park Avenue is U.S. Route 62 between Bailey Avenue and the southern terminus.

Route

Streets in Buffalo, New York
Transportation in Erie County, New York